Macrocephalus is a genus of ambush bugs in the family Reduviidae. There are more than 30 described species in Macrocephalus.

Species
These 37 species belong to the genus Macrocephalus:

 Macrocephalus albinus Tigny, 1801
 Macrocephalus albirostris Tigny, 1801
 Macrocephalus angustus Westwood, 1842
 Macrocephalus arizonicus Cockerell, 1900
 Macrocephalus barberi Evans, 1931
 Macrocephalus bidens Olivier, 1795
 Macrocephalus bimaculatus Olivier, 1795
 Macrocephalus cacao Olivier, 1795
 Macrocephalus cimicoides Swederus, 1787
 Macrocephalus coffeae Billberg, 1820
 Macrocephalus cylindricornis Westwood, 1842
 Macrocephalus dorannae Evans, 1931
 Macrocephalus elongatus Lacordaire, 1830
 Macrocephalus fasciatus Olivier, 1795
 Macrocephalus gracilis Handlirsch, 1897
 Macrocephalus hieroglyphicus Hope, 1831
 Macrocephalus leucographus Klug, 1842
 Macrocephalus longicornis Billberg, 1820
 Macrocephalus lugubris Olivier, 1795
 Macrocephalus macilentus Westwood, 1842
 Macrocephalus manicatus (Fabricius, 1803)
 Macrocephalus marmoreus Olivier, 1795
 Macrocephalus murinus Olivier, 1795
 Macrocephalus niveirostris Olivier, 1795
 Macrocephalus notatus (Westwood, 1841)
 Macrocephalus obscurus Westwood, 1842
 Macrocephalus pallidus Westwood, 1842
 Macrocephalus pulchellus Klug, 1842
 Macrocephalus punctatostriatus Billberg, 1820
 Macrocephalus quadratus Westwood, 1842
 Macrocephalus rhombiventris Westwood, 1842
 Macrocephalus scriptus Billberg, 1820
 Macrocephalus similis Kormilev, 1972
 Macrocephalus tuberculatus Olivier, 1795
 Macrocephalus tuberosus Klug, 1842
 Macrocephalus uhleri Handlirsch, 1898
 Macrocephalus undulatus Billberg, 1820

References

Further reading

 
 
 

Reduviidae
Articles created by Qbugbot